Paracorophium is a genus of amphipods in the family Corophiidae.

Species
 Paracorophium brisbanensis Chapman, 2002
 Paracorophium excavatum (Thomson, 1884)
 Paracorophium lucasi Hurley, 1954

References

Further reading

Corophiidea
Taxa named by Thomas Roscoe Rede Stebbing